David McCann (born 17 March 1973 in Belfast) is an Irish former professional road bicycle racer, who rode in the 1996, 2000 and 2012 Olympic Games. He was the Irish national road race champion in 2000, 2001 and 2006, and won the Irish national time trial championships a record 6 times (2001, 2002, 2004, 2005, 2009 & 2010).  He last rode for the Synergy Baku Cycling Project, an Azerbaijan-registered UCI Continental team.

Biography
In 2005, McCann captured the overall title at the Tour de Korea. In 2006 he won the Tour of Indonesia; 2 stages in the Tour of Thailand; 1 stage at the Tour of Qinghai Lake and 1 stage in the Tour of Azerbaijan. He represented Northern Ireland at the Commonwealth Games time trial, finishing 5th.

On 20 September 2009, McCann broke Chris Boardman's long-standing British 25 mile time trial record in Port Talbot. Later that week, he finished in 11th in the World Championships Elite Time Trial in Mendrisio, Switzerland. His time of 1:01:36.35 was 3 minutes 40 seconds behind the gold medallist Fabian Cancellara. This was McCann's best ever performance at the World Championships. He was UCI ranked 31st on the 2009 Asian Tour, and ranked 4th for the 2010 season with 298.66 points after 11 wins.

He was UCI ranked 42nd on the 2011 UCI Asia Tour (75 pts), thanks mainly to 2nd place GC finishes in the Jelajah Malaysia and in the Tour de Taiwan.

He rode on the Irish three man team for the 2010 World Championships alongside Nicolas Roche and Matt Brammeier, finishing 68th. He won a team pursuit bronze with Northern Ireland at the Commonwealth Games in Delhi, and followed this up with 5th in the Commonwealth Road Race.

In 2002, McCann received a six-month suspension following a positive test for Norandrosterone. He claimed a contaminated glutamine supplement led to the finding. Like several other athletes suspended around this time, McCann was sponsored by sport nutrition company Maximmuscle. After testing 3 nanograms above the permitted level, Laboratory tests showed a legal glutamine supplement he was using contained a minute amount of norandrosterone not listed on the label. This led to him being given the minimum allowed six-month suspension.

Major results

1996
 1st  Overall Tour of Ulster
 1st Shay Elliott Memorial Race
 1st Manx Trophy
 2nd Overall FBD Insurance Rás
1997
 2nd Road race, National Road Championships
1998
 National Road Championships
2nd Road race
2nd Time trial
2000
 1st  Road race, National Road Championships
 1st Stage 8 Tour de Guadeloupe
 2nd Manx Trophy
 2nd Archer Grand Prix
 6th Overall FBD Insurance Rás
1st Stage 6
2001
 National Road Championships
1st  Road race
1st  Time trial
 1st  Overall FBD Insurance Rás
1st Points classification
1st Mountains classification
1st Stage 1
 1st  Overall Tour de Hokkaido
1st Points classification
1st Stages 1, 3 & 5
2002
 1st  Time trial, National Road Championships
 1st Manx Trophy
 8th Time trial, Commonwealth Games
2003
 3rd  Road race, UCI B World Championships
 3rd Manx Trophy
 7th Tour de Okinawa
2004
 National Road Championships
1st  Time trial
2nd Road race
 1st  Overall FBD Insurance Rás
1st Stages 4 & 7
 5th Overall Tour de Korea
1st Stages 1 & 2
 5th Havant International GP
 6th Lincoln Grand Prix
 7th Archer Grand Prix
 9th GP Stad Vilvoorde
2005
 National Road Championships
1st  Time trial
3rd Road race
 1st  Overall Tour de Korea
1st Stage 2
 1st  Overall Tour of Milad du Nour
1st Stage 1
 1st  Overall Tour of Ulster
1st Stage 3
 1st Stage 2 Tour of Indonesia
 1st Stages 3 & 4 
 2nd Overall Tour of Siam
 3rd Overall Herald Sun Tour
1st Stage 6 (ITT)
 3rd Shay Elliott Memorial Race
 4th Overall Kerman Tour
 5th Overall Tour of Azerbaijan (Iran)
1st Stage 3
 6th Overall Tour de Taiwan
 7th Tour de Okinawa
2006
 1st  Road race, National Road Championships
 1st  Overall Tour of Indonesia
 1st Stage 6 Tour of Qinghai Lake
 1st Stages 1 (ITT) & 4 Tour of Thailand
 3rd Overall Herald Sun Tour
 5th Time trial, Commonwealth Games
 5th Overall Tour de Taiwan
2007
 2nd Time trial, National Road Championships
 9th Overall FBD Insurance Rás
2008
 1st Stage 5 Tour de Korea-Japan
 1st Stage 4 FBD Insurance Rás
 2nd Overall Tour of Hainan
 4th Overall Tour of Qinghai Lake
 6th Chrono Champenois
 10th Overall Jelajah Malaysia
2009
 1st  Time trial, National Road Championships
 1st Overall 
1st Points classification
1st Stage 1
 3rd Chrono Champenois
 5th Overall Jelajah Malaysia
 8th Overall FBD Insurance Rás
 10th Time trial, UCI Road World Championships
2010
 National Road Championships
1st  Time trial
4th Road race
 1st  Overall Tour de Taiwan
1st Stage 1
 1st  Overall Jelajah Malaysia
 1st  Overall Tour de Filipinas
1st Stages 1 & 4
 1st  Overall Melaka Governor Cup
1st Stage 1
 1st Stage 2 Tour of Thailand
 Commonwealth Games
3rd  Team pursuit
5th Road race
 5th Overall Tour of Qinghai Lake
 8th Overall Tour of Singkarak
 9th Overall Tour of China
2011
 1st Stage 8 An Post Rás
 National Road Championships
2nd Time trial
3rd Road race
 2nd Overall Tour de Taiwan
 2nd Overall Jelajah Malaysia
 8th Overall Tour of Ulster
1st Stage 1
2012
 2nd Overall Tour of Fuzhou
 3rd Taiwan KOM Challenge
 5th Overall Tour of Taihu Lake
2013
 2nd Time trial, National Road Championships

References

External links

 Irish Times Profile

Irish male cyclists
Living people
1973 births
Cyclists at the 1996 Summer Olympics
Cyclists at the 2000 Summer Olympics
Cyclists at the 2012 Summer Olympics
Olympic cyclists of Ireland
Sportspeople from Belfast
Commonwealth Games bronze medallists for Northern Ireland
Cyclists at the 2010 Commonwealth Games
Commonwealth Games medallists in cycling
Rás Tailteann winners
Medallists at the 2010 Commonwealth Games